Eungam station is a railway station on Seoul Subway Line 6 located in Yeokchon-dong, Eunpyeong-gu, Seoul and is the western terminus of Line 6. Travel time between Eungam Station and Bonghwasan Station, the eastern terminus of Line 6, is approximately 57 minutes.

Station layout

Vicinity
 Sinsa ogeori (5-way junction)
 Eunpyeong-gu Office

Gallery

Station Peripheral Information 
If you go out from Exit 4, there is Bulgwangcheon Stream, and along Bulgwangcheon Stream, the park along the stream extends from here to the Han River.

If you go out to exit 3, there is E-Mart Eunpyeong branch.

If you move from Eungam Station to E-Mart, there is a coffee shop area.

Seoul Christian University is located about 500m away from Exit 2.

References

Seoul Metropolitan Subway stations
Railway stations opened in 2000
Metro stations in Eunpyeong District